Johann Christoph Julius Langbein (September 22, 1846 – January 28, 1910) was an American lawyer and politician from New York. He was a drummer boy in the Union Army and a Medal of Honor recipient for his actions in the American Civil War.

Life
Langbein joined the 9th New York Infantry from New York City in May 1861, and left the regiment in 1863.

He was a Republican member of the New York State Assembly (New York Co., 21st D.) in 1877 and 1879. In November 1879, he was elected Civil Justice of the 10th District.

State Senator George F. Langbein (1842–1911) was his brother and law partner.

Julius Langbein is buried in Woodlawn Cemetery in The Bronx, New York City.

Medal of Honor citation
Rank and organization: Musician, Company B, 9th New York Infantry. Place and date: At Camden, N.C., April 19, 1862. Entered service at: New York, N.Y. Born: September 29, 1846, Germany. Date of issue: January 7, 1895.

Citation:

A drummer boy, 15 years of age, he voluntarily and under a heavy fire went to the aid of a wounded officer, procured medical assistance for him, and aided in carrying him to a place of safety.

See also

List of American Civil War Medal of Honor recipients: A–F

References

 

1845 births
1910 deaths
American Civil War recipients of the Medal of Honor
German-born Medal of Honor recipients
German emigrants to the United States
Republican Party members of the New York State Assembly
Politicians from New York City
People of New York (state) in the American Civil War
Union Army soldiers
United States Army Medal of Honor recipients
19th-century American politicians
Lawyers from New York City
19th-century American lawyers